Giovanni Alberto Ristori (1692 - 7 February 1753) was an Italian opera composer and conductor.

He was the son of Tommaso Ristori, the leader of an opera troupe belonging to the King of Poland and Elector of Saxony August II the Strong (based in Dresden). August II lent his opera troupe to the Russian Empress Anna for the celebration of her coronation in Moscow.  Ristori died in Dresden.

Calandro, his opera in three acts to a libretto by Stefano Benedetto Pallavicino, was both the first opera buffa written in Germany and also the first Italian opera performed in Russia. It was given under his, and his father's direction, with thirteen actors and nine singers including Ludovica Seyfried, Margherita Ermini and Rosalia Fantasia, in 1731 in Moscow.

In 1916 the German musicologist Curt Rudolf Mengelberg published the first study on Ristori and his music: Curt Rudolf Mengelberg, Giovanni Alberto Ristori: ein Beitrag zur Geschichte italienischer Kunstherrschaft in Deutschland im 18. Jahrhundert (Leipzig: Breitkopf & Härtel, 1916). Although short on biographical details it is a landmark publication because Mengelberg had access to many Dresden music sources now missing. This applies especially to Ristori’s sacred music; prior to 1945 Ristori’s sacred music was held both in score and parts by the Dresden State Library (today, Dresden State and University Library (SLUB)). Copies of Ristori's sacred music have been found in Czech and Polish music libraries. The Icelandic independent musicologist Jóhannes Ágústsson’s article "Giovanni Alberto Ristori at the Court of Naples 1738-1740" (Studi pergolesiani – Pergolesi studies 8, eds C. Bacciagaluppi, H.-G. Ottenberg and L. Zoppelli, Bern, Peter Lang, 2012, pp. 53–100), introduced many new biographical details about the Italian composer including previously unknown information about Ristori’s role as the royal music teacher of the Saxon princess Maria Amalia (1724-1760), later Queen of the Two Sicilies and Queen of Spain.

Some of Ristori’s have been released on CD.

Works, editions, and selected recordings
Discography
 Cantatas for Soprano and Oboe concerto. María Savastano (soprano), Jon Olaberria (oboe), Ensemble Diderot, Johannes Pramsohler (Audax Records 2017)
 Missa - on Weihnachten am Dresdner Hof Kopp (Carus)
 Calandro - Batzdorfer Hofkapelle (KammerTon, 2005)
 Divoti Affetti alla Passione di Nostro Signore. Echo du Danube (Accent, 2011)
 Canto Divoti Affetti on La Voce Virtuosa: Lute and the Saxon Vocal Tradition PGM 106 Includes the world-premiere recording of Ristori's "Canto Divoti Affetti" which was presumed until early 1995 to have been destroyed during the World War II bombings of Dresden.

References

External links

Giovanni Alberto Ristori

Italian Baroque composers
Italian male classical composers
Italian opera composers
Male opera composers
1692 births
1753 deaths
18th-century Italian composers
18th-century Italian male musicians